Stigmella cathepostis is a moth of the family Nepticulidae. It is only known from Kyushu in Japan and the Russian Far East (Primorskiy Kray).

There might be up to three generations per year.

The larvae feed on Carpinus tschonoskii. They mine the leaves of their host plant. The mine consists of a linear, nearly full depth gallery which is restricted by mid-rib and lateral veins. The early part of the mine is slender, later it becomes gradually broader, and runs along veins. The mine is whitish green to whitish brown, with a dark brown frass line in centre.

External links
Japanese Species Of The Genus Stigmella (Nepticulidae: Lepidoptera)

Nepticulidae
Moths of Japan
Moths of Asia
Moths described in 1985